Perondi is a village and a former municipality in Berat County, central Albania. At the 2015 local government reform it became a subdivision of the municipality Kuçovë. The population at the 2011 census was 9,005.

General information
The municipality of Perondi was the biggest one of the former Kuçovë District. It is located south-east of the city of Kuçova. It has around 10 000 inhabitants and includes villages of; Perondi, Tapi, Rreth-Tapi, Magjate, Goraj, Velagosht, Drize and Dikater. Perondi is the primeval village in all region and it supposes it has been built since Byzantine Empire.  The church in the center of Perondi was built in the 11th century.

References 

Former municipalities in Berat County
Administrative units of Kuçovë
Villages in Berat County
Populated places disestablished in 2015